The  Mountain West Hockey League (MWHL) is a Senior ice hockey league consisting of teams from the Western United States.

History 
The MWHL was founded in Las Vegas, Nevada by Thomas Brown in 2012. It is a Senior A ice hockey league with clubs spanning the western United States. MWHL clubs are composed of North American and European players with junior, college, and professional experience. The MWHL features two geographic divisions: Sierra and Rocky.

The MWHL regular season runs from November through March. The club with the best record at the end of the regular season is awarded the Commissioner's Cup. The MWHL Cup Playoffs are held in April, culminating in the MWHL Cup Finals. The winner of the MWHL Cup Finals is awarded the MWHL Cup. The league also sponsors the MWHL Classic, a mid-season inter-division game held at a neutral location.

The Park City Pioneers were the first league champion in 2013 defeating the Las Vegas Hookers in the final.

The San Diego Skates became the first repeat champion winning the league championship in 2015 and again in 2016.

Media
The MWHL Network provides news, scores, stats, and features about the league and its clubs via the league website and associated club websites. The MWHL Network also provides live webcast coverage of select games during the regular season and playoffs on its YouTube channel.

Teams

Former teams 
 Arizona Outlaws (2015-19)
Aspen Leafs (2012-14)
 Breckenridge Brewers (2014-15)
 Boulder Bison (2015-16)
 Jackson Hole Moose (2012-14)
 Las Vegas Hookers (2012-13) - renamed Wolves, Cavalry, Jesters
 McCall Buccaneers (2012-13)
North County Checkers (2017-19)
 Orange County Checkers (2014-17) - moved and renamed North County Checkers
 Park City Pioneers (2012-15)
Pikes Peak Vigilantes (2015-19)
 Salt Lake City Ice Wolves (2013-15) - sold and relocated to Oakland; renamed Ice Raiders.
 Salt Lake City Rebels/Golden Eagles (2012-14)
 Sun Valley Suns (2013-14)
 Utah Buccaneers (2015-16)
Vail Yeti (2013-19)
West Coast Seals (2017-19)

Champions

Notable alumni
 Mark Adamek, Park City Pioneers - Utah Grizzlies (ECHL)
 Zack Hale, Park City Pioneers - Watertown Privateers (FHL)
 Jeff Hazelwood, Las Vegas Hookers - Las Vegas Wranglers (ECHL)
 Ben Wilner, Park City Pioneers - Las Vegas Wranglers (ECHL)

See also
 List of ice hockey leagues
 Federal Prospects Hockey League
 Southern Professional Hockey League
Black Diamond Hockey League
 Great Lakes Hockey League

References

External links
MWHL official website

Ice hockey leagues in the United States
Minor league ice hockey